Reno Johan C. Wilmots (born 16 March 1997) is a Belgian footballer who currently plays in Slovenia for Triglav. His father is Marc Wilmots, former trainer of Belgium's national football team.

Club career
On 29 August 2018, he joined Serie B club Carpi, signing a two-year contract with an additional one-year extension option.

On 13 August 2019, he moved to Bisceglie.

On 13 January 2020, Reno and his brother Marten Wilmots signed with Slovenian club Triglav.

Career statistics

References

External links

1997 births
Living people
Belgian footballers
Belgium youth international footballers
Association football defenders
Sint-Truidense V.V. players
K.S.V. Roeselare players
Belgian Pro League players
U.S. Avellino 1912 players
A.C. Carpi players
A.S. Bisceglie Calcio 1913 players
NK Triglav Kranj players
Belgian expatriate footballers
Expatriate footballers in Italy
Expatriate footballers in Slovenia
Serie B players
Serie C players
Slovenian PrvaLiga players